Corton Mill is a Grade II listed tower mill at Corton, Suffolk, England which has been converted to residential accommodation.

History
Corton Mill was erected in 1837. It ceased work before the First World War and was later truncated by one storey. The mill was used for many years as a store.

Description

Corton Mill was a six storey tower mill. It had a boat shaped cap winded by a bladed fantail. The four Patent sails drove two pairs of millstones. The mill was built with room to add a further two pairs of millstones. Photographs show the fantail to have been six bladed and that the sails had ten bays of three shutters.

References

External links
Windmill World webpage on Corton Mill.

Windmills in Suffolk
Tower mills in the United Kingdom
Windmills completed in 1837
Towers completed in 1837
Grinding mills in the United Kingdom
Grade II listed buildings in Suffolk
Grade II listed windmills
Waveney District